Derek Aimone Uberto Antona-Traversi (November 7, 1912 – August 25, 2005) was a British literary critic who spent much of his life abroad employed by the British Council and then at United States universities. His literary criticism ranged from the Renaissance to Modernist poetry, but he specialized in Shakespeare studies. His most famous work is probably An Approach to Shakespeare first published in 1938.

Biography

Early life and education
Traversi was born in 1912 in Caersws in central Wales. His mother was the daughter of a Welsh doctor from Monmouthshire, and his father was a landed northern Italian gentleman. He spent his early years in Italy until the rise of fascism there compelled the family to return to the United Kingdom. Traversi was educated at Alleyn's School and Merton College, Oxford, where he earned his M.A. (1934) and B.Litt. (1937). At University College, London, he earned a B.A. with first class honors in Italian (1938).

Career
Uninterested in joining the common room of a British university, in 1939 Traversi took a position at the British Institute in Rome. While there he was arrested for disrespect to Mussolini. On the commencement of war, he returned to the UK, taking one of the last boats from France.

Physically unfit for military service, Traversi instead was sent to the British Institute of Madrid where he forged a bond with the director and fellow Catholic Walter Starkie. It was during his stay in Spain that Traversi began submitting articles for the Catholic journals The Month, The Dublin Review and Blackfriars. The British government purposely sent British intellectuals, particularly Catholics, with the view to help keep Falangist-Spain neutral despite the propaganda dominance of Germany. Traversi had frequent close encounters with the Guardia Civil owing to his seeming to wander into officially prohibited areas. In 1943 Traversi set up the Barcelona branch of the British Institute, on Passeig de Gràcia, where he organized musical evenings, cocktail parties and conferences, for intellectuals and cultural figures like Carles Riba, Margot Fonteyn and Joan-Antoni Maragall i Noble.

From 1970 to 1980, Traversi was a professor of English literature at Swarthmore College.

Publications

Dissertation
 "Devotional Prose Written on the Continent during the Reign of Elizabeth," B.Litt., University of Oxford, 1937.

Articles

Books
 
   
 
 
 
 
 Introduction to

Notes

References
 
 ]
 
 

1912 births
2005 deaths
Welsh literary critics
People from Powys
Alumni of Merton College, Oxford
Place of death missing